Fauzi is a surname. Notable people with the surname include:

Absor Fauzi (born 1987), Indonesian footballer
Azka Fauzi (born 1996), Indonesian footballer
Gamawan Fauzi (born 1957), Indonesian politician
Helmy Fauzi (born 1964), Indonesian politician
Rishadi Fauzi (born 1990), Indonesian footballer